Pfaffenhofen an der Ilm (Central Bavarian: Pfahofa an da Uim) is a municipality  in Bavaria, Germany, capital of the district Pfaffenhofen. It is located on the river Ilm, and had a population of 23,282 in 2004.

As of a press release in October 2011 from the UN-backed annual International Awards for Liveable Communities (LivCom), Pfaffenhofen an der Ilm was saluted by judges for the quality of its environmental best practice. The Bavarian town of 23,000 people was also named the most liveable city with a population between 20,000-75,000. The elite group of cities fulfilled the awards’ range of key criteria involving environmental best practice, healthy lifestyle of citizens, community involvement as well as arts and cultural heritage.

History 
Evidence of Bronze Age settlements have been found in Pfaffenhofen, with burial mounds found in forest areas north of the town.

Historians believe that monks from Ilmmünster Abbey built the Pfaffenhöfe near Altenstadt in the north of the city, in the 8th century.

The oldest seal of Pfaffenhofen dates back to 1333. In 1388, Pfaffenhofen, together with its church and castle, was destroyed during the War of the Cities.

In 1745 it was the site of the Battle of Pfaffenhofen during the War of the Austrian Succession

Notable people 

 Hans Demmelmeier (1887–1953), politician
 Michael Hefele (born 1990), professional football player
 Joseph Maria Lutz (1893–1972), writer and poet
 Bernd Pichler (born 1969), electrical engineer and professor
 Christoph Ruckhäberle (born 1972), painter
 Anton Thumann (1912–1946), SS Obersturmführer in various concentration camps

See also
Stadtbus Pfaffenhofen
Holy Spirit (Pfaffenhofen an der Ilm)

References

Pfaffenhofen (district)